Peter Chol Wal is a South Sudanese politician and is a member of the Sudan People's Liberation Movement (SPLM).

He was one of six SPLM candidates elected on the party list to the Jonglei State Legislative Assembly in 2010. He was appointed Speaker in December 2010.

References

Living people
People from Jonglei State
Sudan People's Liberation Movement politicians
Year of birth missing (living people)